"Velvet Chains" is a song written by Kevin Welch and Ron Hellard, and recorded by American country music artist Gary Morris.  It was released in November 1982 as the first single from the album Why Lady Why.  The song reached #9 on the Billboard Hot Country Singles & Tracks chart.

Chart performance

References

1983 singles
Gary Morris songs
Song recordings produced by Paul Worley
Songs written by Kevin Welch
Warner Records singles
1982 songs
Songs written by Ron Hellard